"Maledetta Primavera" (Italian for "Damned Springtime") is a song written by Paolo Cassella and Gaetano Savio and performed by Italian singer Loretta Goggi in 1981, at the 31st edition of Sanremo Music Festival. The song didn't win the Festival, making it only to the second place, however, it became a hit in Italy, and later covers became a hit in several other languages around the world.

Cover versions
In Latin America, Mexican singer Yuri included a cover, "La maldita primavera", in her 1981 album Llena de dulzura, topping the single chart in Mexico, Argentina, Spain, Venezuela and Costa Rica. The album itself sold more than 2.6 million copies, more than 360.000 in Mexico alone. Another Mexican singer, Yuridia, recorded this in her 2005 album La Voz de un Ángel. In 2012, Dominican singer Yiyo Sarante made a cover of "La Maldita Primavera" in salsa.

Finnish singer Paula Koivuniemi published the Finnish version "Aikuinen nainen" in 1982. It became a major success in her country and she has performed it at live concerts ever since. In Germany, Caterina Valente sang the cover "Das kommt nie wieder". In Belgium, Dana Winner sang both the Dutch version "Vrij als een vogel" and the English version "Flying high". Maja Blagdan sang the Croatian version "Zaboravi". In the Czech Republic, Petra Janů sang a popular cover called "Moje malá premiéra". In Slovenia, Tinkara Kovač sang the Slovenian cover version "Vigred s snegom me odeva".

In 2006 singer Patrizio Buanne included a cover in his album Forever Begins Tonight (Universal Music TV).

Charts

References

1981 songs
Number-one singles in Italy
Number-one singles in Spain
Sanremo Music Festival songs
Warner Music Group singles
Songs written by Totò Savio
Caterina Valente songs
Yuri (Mexican singer) songs